Ben Hunte (born 18 October 1992) is a British investigative journalist, presenter and senior reporter at Vice News. He previously worked for the BBC and was the broadcaster's first LGBT correspondent. He went on to be the BBC's West Africa correspondent.

In May 2022, Ben Hunte was listed on the Forbes 30 Under 30 list.

Early life and education
Hunte was born in London to Caribbean parents.

He studied at the University of Nottingham Malaysia Campus on an all-expenses-paid scholarship, graduating in 2014 with a Bachelor of Science in Neuroscience. During his time there, he became president of the Students' Association and was co-founding editor of the student magazine Ignite. He later graduated with a Master of Arts in Broadcast Journalism from City, University of London, which he also attended on a full scholarship.

Hunte has since received an Alumni Laureate Award from the University of Nottingham, and an XCity Award from City University.

Career
While working in strategy at Google, Hunte started a YouTube channel and social media presence. After hitting 50,000 subscribers he left Google to become a full-time influencer and trained to be a journalist. Starting at BBC News as an intern, Hunte went on to be a news anchor for BBC News Africa and hosted What's New?, the BBC's first programme and digital service for children.

In 2019, Hunte became the BBC's first official LGBT correspondent, reporting for all BBC and BBC News platforms.

In 2020, Hunte took the top spot in the Guardian and DIVA Magazine's Pride Power List. Hunte was also awarded "Journalist of the Year" by One Young World, and was a finalist for Specialist Journalist of the Year at the British Journalism Awards, as well as Young Talent of the Year at the Royal Television Society Awards.

He then took on the role of the network's West Africa correspondent in March 2021, reporting from across the continent, in places such as Dakar, Senegal.

After working with the BBC for five years, Hunte announced his departure in September 2021 to join Vice News as a Senior Reporter.

In May 2022, Ben Hunte was listed on Forbes 30 Under 30 Europe list for media and marketing.

Personal life
Hunte has talked extensively about life as a Black gay man and the abuse he receives being in the public eye, as well as his experiences of sexual abuse.

He appeared on the cover of Attitude's 25th anniversary edition in March 2019, and in the Evening Standard's ES Magazine.

References

External links 

1991 births
Living people
21st-century British journalists
Alumni of City, University of London
Black British writers
British male journalists
English people of Guyanese descent
English people of Jamaican descent
British gay writers
Journalists from London
LGBT Black British people
British LGBT journalists
English LGBT people
People from Walthamstow
People from Woodford, London
21st-century LGBT people